Larry Gottheim (born 1936) is an American avant-garde filmmaker.

Early life
Gottheim was born December 3, 1936. He attended a high school for music and the arts.

Gottheim went to Oberlin College for undergraduate studies, where he became interested in poetry and fiction. He earned a Ph.D. in comparative literature at Yale University.

Career
Gottheim became a faculty member at Binghamton University, where he began teaching literature. He purchased a Bolex camera and began learning how to make films. In 1969 Gottheim brought filmmaker Ken Jacobs to Binghamton, and they established a film department, the first in the SUNY system. His Elective Affinities series, named after the novel by Johann Wolfgang von Goethe, is a collection of four films: Mouches Volantes, Four Shadows, Tree of Knowledge, and Natural Selection.

Filmography

 Blues (1970)
 Fog Line (1970)
 Corn (1970)
 Doorway (1971)
 Thought (1971)
 Harmonica (1971)
 Barn Rushes (1971)
 Horizons (1973)
 Mouches Volantes (1976)
 Four Shadows (1978)
 Tree of Knowledge (1981)
 Natural Selection (1984)
 Sorry / Hear Us (1986)
 Mnemosyne Mother of Muses (1987)
 The Red Thread (1987)
 Machette Gillette... Mama (1989)
 Your Television Traveler (1991)
 Chants and Dances for Hand (2016)

References

External links
 
 

1936 births
American experimental filmmakers
Binghamton University faculty
Living people
Oberlin College alumni
Yale University alumni